Koba Kurtanidze (October 13, 1964 – December 6, 2005) was a Soviet Judoka.  Koba Kurtanidze won the 1989 European Judo Championships.

References

External links
 

1964 births
2005 deaths
Soviet male judoka
People from Gori, Georgia
Male judoka from Georgia (country)
Male murder victims
Murder victims from Georgia (country)
People murdered in Georgia (country)
2005 murders in Georgia (country)